Gillian "Gil" Adamson (born January 1, 1961) is a Canadian writer. She won the Books in Canada First Novel Award in 2008 for her 2007 novel The Outlander.

Biography 
Adamson's first published work was Primitive, a volume of poetry, in 1991. She followed up with the short story collection Help Me, Jacques Cousteau in 1995 and a second volume of poetry, Ashland, in 2003, as well as multiple chapbooks and a commissioned fan biography of Gillian Anderson, Mulder, It's Me, which she coauthored with her sister-in-law Dawn Connolly in 1997. A selection of Adamson's poetry also appeared in the anthology Surreal Estate: 13 Canadian Poets Under the Influence (The Mercury Press, 2004). The Outlander, a novel set in the Canadian West at the turn of the 20th century, was published by House of Anansi in the spring of 2007 and won the Hammett Prize that year. The novel was later selected for the 2009 edition of Canada Reads, where it was championed by actor Nicholas Campbell.

Her most recent novel, Ridgerunner, was published in May 2020. The novel won the Writers' Trust Fiction Prize, and was shortlisted for the Giller Prize.

Adamson lives in Toronto with poet Kevin Connolly.

Select Works

See also

Canadian literature
Canadian poetry
List of Canadian poets
List of Canadian writers

References

External links
 Gil Adamson
 CBC Digital Archives – Gil Adamson, Canada Reads author
 

Canadian women novelists
Canadian women poets
Writers from Toronto
1961 births
Living people
Place of birth missing (living people)
21st-century Canadian novelists
20th-century Canadian poets
21st-century Canadian poets
Canadian women short story writers
20th-century Canadian women writers
21st-century Canadian women writers
20th-century Canadian short story writers
21st-century Canadian short story writers
Amazon.ca First Novel Award winners